Robert John Bartlett, CBE, FBA, FRSE (born 27 November 1950 in Streatham) is an English historian and medievalist. He is Bishop Wardlaw Professor of Mediaeval History Emeritus at the University of St Andrews.

After attending Battersea Grammar School in London (1962 to 1969), he studied at Peterhouse, Cambridge, St John's College, Oxford and Princeton University as a Jane Eliza Procter Visiting Fellow. He obtained research fellowships at several institutions, including the University of Michigan and University of Göttingen, before working at the University of Edinburgh, the University of Chicago and the University of St Andrews, where he currently resides.

He is particularly known for his work The Making of Europe: Conquest, Colonization and Cultural Change, 950-1350, which won the Wolfson History Prize in 1993. He specializes in medieval colonialism, the cult of saints, and England between the 11th century and the 14th century. He gave the 2007 Ford Lectures at the University of Oxford. He wrote and presented Inside The Medieval Mind, a four-part documentary broadcast by the BBC in 2008 as part of a medieval season.

In 2010, he wrote and presented The Normans on the BBC, a documentary series about their wide-ranging impact on Britain, countries of the Mediterranean and as far afield as the Holy Land. In 2014, he presented the BBC documentary series The Plantagenets, about the eponymous royal dynasty.

Select bibliography
 Gerald of Wales, 1146-1223, (Oxford, 1982)
 Trial by fire and water : the medieval judicial ordeal (Oxford, 1986)
 (ed. with Angus MacKay) Medieval frontier societies
 The Making of Europe: Conquest, Colonization and Cultural Change, 950-1350 (London, 1993)
 England Under the Norman and Angevin Kings, (Oxford, 2000)
 Medieval and Modern Concepts of Race and Ethnicity (Scotland 2001) Published in 'Journal of Medieval and Early Modern Studies 31:1, Winter 2001
 (ed.& tr.) Life and miracles of St Modwenna, (Oxford, 2002)
 (ed.& tr.) The miracles of Saint Æbbe of Coldingham and Saint Margaret of Scotland, (Oxford, 2003)
 The Hanged Man: A Story of Miracle, Memory and Colonialism in the Middle Ages, (Princeton, 2005)
 Gerald of Wales: A Voice of the Middle Ages, (Tempus, 2006) [revised edition of Gerald of Wales, 1146-1223]
 The Natural and the Supernatural in the Middle Ages (The Wiles Lectures), (Cambridge University Press, 2008)
 Why Can the Dead Do Such Great Things?: Saints and Worshippers from the Martyrs to the Reformation, (Princeton University Press, 2013)
 Blood Royal: Dynastic Politics in Medieval Europe, (Cambridge University Press, 2020)
 The Middle Ages and the Movies: Eight Key Films, (Reaktion Books, 2022)

References

External links
 Professor Robert Bartlett, in Who's Who 2011, online edition
 Profile at St Andrews
 Listing at New York Review of Books
 Inside the Medieval Mind, Open University

1950 births
Living people
People from Streatham
Alumni of St John's College, Oxford
Alumni of Peterhouse, Cambridge
Princeton University alumni
English historians
British medievalists
Academics of the University of Edinburgh
Commanders of the Order of the British Empire
Fellows of the Royal Society of Edinburgh
University of Michigan fellows
Fellows of the British Academy
People educated at Battersea Grammar School